Systems modeling or system modeling is the interdisciplinary study of the use of models to conceptualize and construct systems in business and IT development.

A common type of systems modeling is function modeling, with specific techniques such as the Functional Flow Block Diagram and IDEF0. These models can be extended using functional decomposition, and can be linked to requirements models for further systems partition.

Contrasting the functional modeling, another type of systems modeling is architectural modeling which uses the systems architecture to conceptually model the structure, behavior, and more views of a system.

The Business Process Modeling Notation (BPMN), a graphical representation for specifying business processes in a workflow, can also be considered to be a systems modeling language.

Overview 
In business and IT development the term "systems modeling" has multiple meanings. It can relate to:
 the use of model to conceptualize and construct systems
 the interdisciplinary study of the use of these models
 the systems modeling, analysis, and design efforts 
 the systems modeling and simulation, such as system dynamics
 any specific systems modeling language
As a field of study systems modeling has emerged with the development of system theory and systems sciences.

As a type of modeling systems modeling is based on systems thinking and the systems approach. In business and IT systems modeling contrasts other approaches such as:
 agent based modeling 
 data modeling and 
 mathematical modeling
In "Methodology for Creating Business Knowledge" (1997) Arbnor and Bjerke the systems approach (systems modeling) was considered to be one of the three basic methodological approaches for gaining business knowledge, beside the analytical approach and the actor's approach (agent based modeling).

History 
The function model originates in the 1950s, after in the first half of the 20th century other types of management diagrams had already been developed. The first known Gantt chart was developed in 1896 by Karol Adamiecki, who called it a harmonogram. Because Adamiecki did not publish his chart until 1931 - and in any case his works were published in either Polish or Russian, languages not popular in the West - the chart now bears the name of  Henry Gantt (1861–1919), who designed his chart around the years 1910-1915 and popularized it in the West. One of the first well defined function models, was the Functional Flow Block Diagram (FFBD) developed by the defense-related TRW Incorporated in the 1950s. In the 1960s it was exploited by the NASA to visualize the time sequence of events in a space systems and flight missions. It is further widely used in classical systems engineering to show the order of execution of system functions.

One of the earliest pioneering works in information systems modeling has been done by Young and Kent (1958), who argued:

Since we may be called upon to evaluate different computers or to find alternative ways of organizing current systems it is necessary to have some means of precisely stating a data processing problem independently of mechanization.

They aimed for a precise and abstract way of specifying the informational and time characteristics of a data processing problem, and wanted to create a notation that should enable the analyst to organize the problem around any piece of hardware. Their efforts was not so much focused on independent systems analysis, but on creating abstract specification and invariant basis for designing different alternative implementations using different hardware components.

A next step in IS modeling was taken by CODASYL, an IT industry consortium formed in 1959, who essentially aimed at the same thing as Young and Kent: the development of "a proper structure for machine independent problem definition language, at the system level of data processing". This led to the development of a specific IS information algebra.

Types of systems modeling 
In business and IT development systems are modeled with different scopes and scales of complexity, such as:
 Functional modeling
 Systems architecture
 Business process modeling
 Enterprise modeling

Further more like systems thinking, systems modeling in can be divided into:
 Systems analysis
 Hard systems modeling or operational research modeling 
 Soft system modeling 
Process based system modeling 
And all other specific types of systems modeling, such as form example complex systems modeling, dynamical systems modeling, and critical systems modeling.

Specific types of modeling languages 
 Framework-specific modeling language
 Systems Modeling Language

See also 
 Behavioral modeling
 Dynamic systems
 Human visual system model a human visual system model used by image processing, video processing, and computer vision
 SEQUAL framework
 Software and Systems Modeling
 Solar system model a model that illustrate the relative positions and motions of the planets and stars
 Statistical model
 Systems analysis
 Systems design
 Systems biology modeling
 Viable system model a model of the organizational structure of any viable or autonomous system

References

Further reading 

 Doo-Kwon Baik eds. (2005). Systems modeling and simulation: theory and applications : third Asian Simulation Conference, AsiaSim 2004, Jeju Island, Korea, October 4–6, 2004. Springer, 2005. . 
 Derek W. Bunn, Erik R. Larsen (1997). Systems modelling for energy policy. Wiley, 1997.  
 Hartmut Ehrig et al. (eds.) (2005). Formal methods in software and systems modeling. Springer, 2005 
 D. J. Harris (1985). Mathematics for business, management, and economics: a systems modelling approach. E. Horwood, 1985. 
 Jiming Liu, Xiaolong Jin, Kwok Ching Tsui (2005). Autonomy oriented computing: from problem solving to complex systems modeling. Springer, 2005.  
 Michael Pidd (2004). Systems Modelling: Theory and Practice. John Wiley & Sons, 2004.  
 Václav Pinkava (1988). Introduction to Logic for Systems Modelling. Taylor & Francis, 1988. 

Enterprise modelling
Software development
Systems analysis
Systems science
Management cybernetics